ROSTA Posters (also known as ROSTA Windows, ROSTA being an acronym for the Russian Telegraph Agency, the state news agency from 1918 to 1935) were a propagandistic medium of communication used in the Soviet Union to communicate important messages and instill specific beliefs and ideology within the minds of the masses.

Emergence

Style 
Rosta posters were easily identifiable by their context and distinct style.

Agitprop 
The basis for the content of ROSTA posters was political messages from the Soviet Union, sometimes referred to as agitprop. Agitprop is political propaganda, especially the communist propaganda used in Soviet Russia, that is spread to the general public through popular media such as literature, plays, pamphlets, films, and other art forms with an explicitly political message.

Examples

See also 
 Okna TASS, the Soviet News Agency's series of hand-printed propaganda posters during World War II 1941 – 1945

References
 

 Ward, Alex (2008). Power to the People: Early Soviet Propaganda Posters in the Israel Museum, Jerusalem. London, UK, Ashgate, 

Propaganda in the Soviet Union
Propaganda posters